The Harvard Crimson baseball team is the varsity intercollegiate baseball team of Harvard University, located in Boston, Massachusetts. The program has been a member of the Ivy League since the conference officially began sponsoring baseball at the start of the 1993 season. The team plays at Joseph J. O'Donnell Field, located across the Charles River from Harvard's main campus. Bill Decker has been the program's head coach since the 2013 season.

The program has appeared in four College World Series and 14 NCAA Tournaments. It has won five Ivy League Championship Series, eight Rolfe Division titles, 15 EIBL regular season titles, and 12 Ivy League regular season titles. In 2019, the team won its first Ivy League title since 2005 when they defeated Columbia in the Ivy League Playoff Series.

As of the start of the 2014 Major League Baseball season, 12 former Crimson players have appeared in Major League Baseball.

History

19th century

Harvard College's first season of baseball came in 1865; the team went 6–0 that year. It played one intercollegiate game (against Williams) and five against semi-professional teams. Organized baseball at the college had begun a few years earlier, when "class nines" (the teams of each of Harvard College's four class years) were first fielded; the first of these was the '66 Baseball Club, formed in 1862 by members of that year's freshman class. Despite these early years of competition, 1865 was the school's first varsity intercollegiate season.

Along with rowing, baseball was popular at Harvard in the late 19th century. A newspaper review of the 1871 book Four Years at Yale says that the book includes "interesting accounts of the sports common in colleges, especially baseball and rowing, and the principal matches which have taken place between Harvard and Yale." An 1884 edition of the Washington Bee reprinted a Lowell Courier humor section piece that reads, "Sixty Harvard freshman have dropped their Latin, eighty their Greek and 100 their mathematics. None of them have dropped their baseball or their boating, however, and college culture is still safe."

In a game against a semi-professional team from Lynn on April 12, 1877, Harvard catcher Jim Tyng became the first baseball player to use a catcher's mask. The mask was invented by another student, Frederick Thayer, and manufactured by a Cambridge tinsmith. Tyng later became the first Harvard player to appear in Major League Baseball when he played in a September 23, 1879, game for the Boston Red Caps.

In the 1870s and 1880s, Harvard was a member of two loosely organized forerunners of the Ivy League. The Intercollegiate Base Ball Association, which it played in from 1879 to 1886, included Yale, Princeton, Dartmouth, Brown, and Amherst. The College Baseball League, which it played in from 1887 to 1889, featured Yale, Princeton, and Columbia.

The school continued to field a varsity baseball team through the end of the 19th century. It played both fall and spring regular season games in its early years, but moved to a spring-only schedule after the 1885–1886 season. The program's highest 19th-century win total was 34, a mark it reached in both 1870 (34–9–1) and 1892 (34–5). Through the end of the 1899 season, the program played without a head coach and was instead led by its captains.

Two important changes to the program occurred near the end of the 19th century– at the start of the 1898 season, Harvard began playing home games at Soldier's Field, and at the start of the 1900 season, it hired E. H. Nichols as its first head coach.

Pre-World War II
The program went .500 or better in 15 of the 17 seasons from 1900 to 1916. Its highest win total in that stretch, 23, came in 1915 under head coach Percy Haughton. Two head coaches served four-season tenures during the time period. L. P. Pieper coached from 1907 to 1910; the program's two losing records in this time period came under him. Frank Sexton also coached for four seasons (1911–1914); the program had a winning record in each.

In the early 20th century, Harvard held tryouts, usually in the spring, to select the members of the team from the student body. To start the regular season, the team often traveled to the Southern United States to play games in warm weather, a practice that began in 1898. Up until the start of World War I, its scheduled included professional and semi-professional teams, in addition to collegiate teams.

Hall of Fame pitcher Cy Young, then a member of the Boston Americans, served as the team's pitching coach for a brief time in 1902. Another future Hall of Famer, Willie Keeler of the Brooklyn Superbas, served alongside Young as the team's hitting coach.

William Clarence Matthews was Harvard's shortstop from 1902 to 1905. Matthews was black. A handful of black students graduated from Harvard around that time (its first black graduate, Richard Theodore Greener, was a member of the class of 1870), but Matthews one of only a few black players in major college athletics during an era in which baseball was divided by the color line. Harvard went 75–18 during Matthews's career. As a freshman, he scored the winning run in Harvard's 6–5 win in the decisive game of the Yale series; he also led the team in batting average as a sophomore, junior, and senior. Matthews faced racial discrimination while a member of the team. During his freshman season, he was held out of games against Navy and Virginia due to their objections to Harvard's fielding a black player. In 1903, the following year, Harvard canceled its annual southern trip when it faced similar objections. After Harvard, Matthews played one season of professional baseball and went on to a career in law. The trophy given to the Ivy League's baseball champion is named for Matthews. He was inducted into the College Baseball Hall of Fame in 2014.

The 1917 season was canceled because of World War I, but the program resumed play in 1918. Through the 1932 season, the program competed as an independent school. For the 1933 season, however, Harvard joined the Eastern Intercollegiate Baseball League (EIBL), which had been formed by several Ivy League schools for the start of the 1930 season.

Prior to the start of the 1929 season, Fred Mitchell was hired for his third stint as Harvard head baseball coach (he also led the program during the 1916 and 1926 seasons). Mitchell's third stint lasted from 1929 to 1938– Harvard's final four seasons as an independent and first six in the EIBL. Under Mitchell, Harvard won its first EIBL title; with an 8–4 league record in 1936, it tied Dartmouth for the championship. Mitchell resigned following the 1938 season and was replaced by Floyd Stahl. In Stahl's first season, Harvard won its second EIBL title, finishing with a 9–3 league record.

Because of World War II, Harvard competed as an independent in 1943 and 1946 and did not sponsor a team in 1944 or 1945.

Post-World War II

EIBL
Harvard rejoined the EIBL for the 1947 season. For the 1948 season, Brown joined the seven other Ivy League schools in the league; Army and Navy also joined, giving the league 10 members. In the immediate postwar years, under head coaches Adolph Samborski (1947–1948) and Stuffy McInnis (1949–1954), the program finished no higher than 4th in the EIBL.

Norman Shepard became the program's head coach for the start of the 1955 season. Under Shepard, Harvard won four EIBL titles (1955, 1958, 1964, 1968), going undefeated in league play in 1958 and 1964. In 1968, Shepard's final season, the team qualified for its first NCAA Tournament. In order for Harvard to play in the tournament, Shepard threatened to speed up his retirement if the NCAA did not reschedule the District 1 Regional to avoid a conflict with Harvard's final exams. His threat succeeded, and Harvard won the rescheduled District 1 Regional, defeating Boston University once and Connecticut twice to advance to the College World Series. There, it lost its opening game to St. John's, 2–0, and an elimination game to Southern Illinois, 2–1.

Loyal Park was hired as head coach prior to the start of the 1969 season. After finishing tied for 5th and tied for 2nd in the EIBL in his first two seasons, the program had its most successful four-year stretch from 1971 to 1974. Harvard won four consecutive EIBL titles and played in three College World Series. In 1971, Harvard won the EIBL outright and swept Massachusetts in a best-of-three District 1 Regional. In the College World Series, Harvard defeated BYU, 4–1, in its opening game, but was eliminated by consecutive one-run losses to Tulsa and Texas–Pan American. In 1972, Harvard tied Cornell for the EIBL title, but won a playoff to advance to that year's NCAA tournament. There, it advanced to the District 1 Regional finals, but lost to Connecticut, 11–2. In 1973, the program won the EIBL outright and went undefeated in the District 1 Regional to advance to the College World Series. There, it lost consecutive games to Southern California and Georgia Southern. In 1974, Harvard defeated Princeton in an EIBL tiebreaker playoff and won the District 1 Regional, but lost consecutive games to Miami and Northern Colorado at the 1974 College World Series. Park coached through the end of the 1978 season, in which Harvard won the EIBL and played in the NCAA tournament.

Alex Nahigian replaced Park and was the program's head coach from 1979 to 1990. Nahigian had been the head coach at Providence from 1960 to 1978. Under Nahigian, Harvard appeared in three NCAA tournaments (1980, 1983, 1984). In both 1980 and 1983, it advanced to the Northeast Regional final, but lost there to St. John's in 1980 and Maine in 1983. During Nahigian's 12-year tenure, Harvard's overall record was 249–152–3.

During the successful years under Shepard, Park, and Nahigian, many Crimson players distinguished themselves individually. The era from 1955–1990 saw 17 First-Team All-America selections and 31 Major League Baseball Draft selections. Paul del Rossi, a pitcher under Shepard from 1962 to 1964, set the EIBL/Ivy career record for wins, with 30. Future Major Leaguer Mike Stenhouse, who played for Park and Nahigian from 1977 to 1979, set single-season and career EIBL/Ivy batting average records, was twice named a First-Team All-American, and was a first-round draft pick of the Oakland Athletics in 1979. Another future Major Leaguer, Jeff Musselman, was the 1985 EIBL Pitcher of the Year.

Ivy League
During the tenure of Leigh Hogan (1991–1995), the EIBL folded, and the Ivy League began sponsoring baseball. Several northeast schools had formed the Patriot League in 1986, and the two non-Ivy members of the EIBL, Army and Navy, had joined the league in other sports– Army in 1990–1991 and Navy in 1991–1992. Both schools' baseball programs played their last seasons in the EIBL in 1992. Beginning with the 1993 season, the Ivy League sponsored baseball. Its eight teams competed in two four-team divisions: Harvard, Dartmouth, Yale, and Brown in the Rolfe Division, and Columbia, Cornell, Princeton, and Penn in the Gehrig Division. The division winners met in a best-of-three championship series to decide the conference's automatic bid to the NCAA tournament.

Hogan resigned following the 1995 season after coaching the program for its first three Ivy League seasons, and Suffolk head coach Joe Walsh was hired to replace him. Starting with Walsh, Harvard made its head baseball coaching position a full-time position.

In Walsh's first season, 1996, Harvard won the Rolfe Division, finishing three games ahead of second-place Yale, but was swept by Princeton in the best-of-three Ivy League Championship Series. Harvard then made three consecutive NCAA tournaments, after last having qualified in 1984. It defeated Princeton in the championship series in each season. As the sixth seed in the 1997 NCAA tournament, it placed third in the six-team, double-elimination Midwest Regional. After defeating first-seeded UCLA, 7–2, and fourth-seeded Stetson, 8–6, to open the regional, it lost consecutive games to host Oklahoma State and UCLA and was eliminated. As the fifth seed in the 1998 NCAA tournament, it again finished third in its regional. After losing its opening game to second-seeded Cal State Fullerton, it won elimination games against Nicholls State and Tulane before being eliminated by Fullerton. In the 1999 tournament, the first year of four-team regionals, Harvard lost consecutive games to Pepperdine and VCU.

Harvard won four more Rolfe Division titles in the early 2000s, thus appearing in four Ivy League Championship Series (2002, 2003, 2005, 2006). It won the 2002 series (over Princeton) and 2005 series (over Cornell) to advance to two NCAA tournaments. It went 0–2 in both. In the late 2000s and early 2010s, the program struggled, winning no Rolfe Division titles and finishing last in the division in 2008, 2011, and 2014.

On July 31, 2012, Walsh died of a heart attack in his Chester, New Hampshire home. He was 58 years old and had coached the program for 17 seasons, appearing in five NCAA tournaments. Beginning in 2014, the NEIBA All-Star Game was named for Walsh. In September 2012, the school hired Bill Decker to replace Walsh. Decker came from Division III Trinity (CT), where he had been the head coach for 22 seasons and won the 2008 National Championship.

Prior to the 2013 season, several players were implicated in an academic cheating scandal and were forced to withdraw from Harvard. The 2013 team's record was 10–31 (7–13 Ivy); it finished third in the Rolfe Division.

Conference affiliations
 Independent (1865–1916, 1918–1932, 1943, 1946)
 Eastern Intercollegiate Baseball League (1933–1942, 1947–1992)
 Ivy League (1993–present)

Venues

Early venues

In its first few decades, the team played at several venues around Cambridge and Boston. Besides occasionally using sites on Cambridge Common or Boston Common, the school had regular venues on campus. It spent its first two seasons (1865–1866) playing at the Delta, where Memorial Hall currently stands. From 1867 to 1883, the team's main venue was Jarvis Field, which Harvard also used for football at the time. From 1884 to 1897, the baseball team used Holmes Field, which also doubled as one of Harvard's early football venues.

Soldier's Field / Joseph J. O'Donnell Field

In 1890, Major Henry Lee Higginson donated a parcel of land on the Allston-Brighton side of the Charles River for Harvard's use. Higginson dedicated the site Soldier's Field, for six of his friends who had died fighting in the Civil War. For the start of the 1898 season, the baseball program moved to the site and shared the venue with the football and track and field teams. The venue's first game came on April 27, 1898. Harvard defeated Dartmouth, 13–7.

On May 4, 1997, the stadium was rededicated for Joseph J. O'Donnell, a Harvard alumnus, donor, and former baseball and football player. The venue has a capacity of 1,600 spectators.

Head coaches
From the program's inception at the start of the 1865 season through the end of the 1899 season, the program did not have a head coach and was instead led by its captains. In the 1900 season, E. H. Nichols became the program's first head coach. Frank Sexton, who held the position from 1911–1914, was the team's first professional coach. The position became a full-time position beginning with the 1996 season, thanks to a $2.5 million endowment from program alumnus Joseph O'Donnell.

In the early years of the position, men commonly held it for only one season. (Prior to the 1930s, the position was held for a single season 11 times.) Since then, however, five men have coached the team for at least a decade: Fred Mitchell, Norman Shepard, Loyal Park, Alex Nahigian, and Joe Walsh. Walsh, who was the program's head coach for 17 seasons (1996–2012), served the longest tenure of any coach in program history and is also its wins leader, with 347.

Current coaching staff
Harvard's coaching staff for the 2019 Season consisted of head coach Bill Decker and assistant coaches Bryan Stark, Brady Kirkpatrick, Kyle Decker and Morgan Brown.

Bill Decker

Bill Decker has been the program's head coach since the start of the 2013 season. A 1984 graduate of Ithaca College, Decker's coaching career began with assistant positions at Division III schools Wesleyan (CT) and Macalester. After these, he was named the head coach at Trinity (CT) for the start of the 1991 season. Decker spent 22 seasons at Trinity, compiling a 529–231 record. He was named New England Coach of the Year and NESCAC Coach of the Year four times each. Under him, Trinity appeared in nine NCAA Tournaments and won five NESCAC Tournament titles. In the 2008 season, the team nearly went undefeated, in the end finishing at 45–1 and winning the Division III National Championship.

Assistant coaches

Bryan Stark joined the Harvard baseball team as an assistant coach in the fall of 2014 after two seasons at Navy in the same capacity. Stark was promoted to Associate Head Coach in the summer of 2019. In 2019, Stark was a member of the staff that coached the Crimson to its first Ivy League title and NCAA appearance since 2005. Seven members of the team earned Ivy League honors, including Jake Suddelson, who was named Ivy League Player of the Year. Stark and the Harvard staff were instrumental in helping two of its players, Patrick McColl and Hunter Bigge, become MLB draft selections. In his fourth season with the Crimson, Stark accompanied a successful Harvard team to a Beanpot Championship title—its first since 2014 and fifth in program history — and its most wins since 2005 with a 22–20 overall record. Harvard tied for third in the conference with a record of 12–9, with contribution from seven All-Ivy players and four NEIBA All-New England selections. In 2018, Stark was a part of the coaching staff that helped Noah Zavolas and Simon Rosenblum-Larson become 2018 MLB Draft picks for the Seattle Mariners and Tampa Bay Rays, respectively. In addition, the team was recognized for the NCAA Academic Progress Rate Public Recognition Award, with 21 players recognized by the ECAC for academic accomplishments. In 2016, Stark helped Harvard to their most successful season since 2010, going 17–24 overall, and 9–11 in Ivy League play. Under his mentorship, John Fallon and Matt Rothenberg emerged as dangerous threats in the Harvard lineup. In his first season at Harvard, he played a key role in helping the team to an 18–24 record in the 2015 season, giving the program its most wins since 2007.

Brady Kirkpatrick was added to the Harvard baseball staff in July 2018. Kirkpatrick will primarily work with the pitching staff and comes to Cambridge after a two-year stint at Monmouth University, with prior coaching and recruiting experience at the University of Rochester and the University of San Diego. In his first season with the Crimson, Kirkpatrick helped guide the team to its first Ivy League Championship and NCAA Tournament appearance since 2005. Kirkpatrick served as the team's pitching coach, helping the team to 27 victories, the most since 2005. One of his players, Hunter Bigge, earned All-Ivy League honors after holding opponents to a .254 average and striking out 76 batters in 74.2 innings pitched. After the season, Bigge was selected by the Chicago Cubs in the 12th round of the MLB Draft. Kirkpatrick was also instrumental in helping Kieran Shaw break the Crimson saves record in 2019. Shaw totaled 13 saves, most in the Ivy League and tied for 11th in the NCAA. While at Monmouth, Kirkpatrick helped lead the Hawks to a MAAC regular season title in 2018 and coached Dan Klepchick to MAAC Rookie of the Year as well as a Collegiate Baseball News Freshman All-America recognition. Prior to his coaching career, Kirkpatrick pitched collegiately for three seasons at the University of Maryland before completing his career at the University of San Diego while obtaining his master's degree. With the Terrapins, Kirkpatrick started 11 games as a junior and held opponents to a .256 batting average, third on the team, after pitching to a 3.04 ERA as a sophomore. In total, he tossed 169 innings as a Terp, striking out 122. He was part of the 2014 South Carolina Regional championship team as well as the first Super Regional Team in Maryland history. He spent the summer of 2012 pitching for the Brewster Whitecaps in the Cape Cod Summer League, throwing to a 3.51 ERA.

Yearly records
The following is a table of the program's yearly records. From its inception at the start of the 1865 season through the end of the 1899 season, the teams had no head coaches and were instead led by captains. The university did not sponsor a program in 1917, because of World War I, or from 1944–1945, because of World War II.

Notable former players

The following is a list of notable former Crimson players and the seasons in which they played for the program, where available.

 John Chase (1926–28)
 Walter Clarkson (1898–1903)
 Jocko Conlon (1922)
 Charlie Devens (1930, 1932)
 David Forst (1994–98)
 Erwin Gehrke
 Brent Suter
 Tanner Anderson
 Shawn Haviland
 Percy Haughton (1899)
 Frank Herrmann (2003–05)
 Michael Hill (1990–93)
 Robert Kernan
 Tony Lupien (1937–39)
 Eddie Mahan (1914–16)
 Saul Mariaschin
 William Clarence Matthews (1902–05)
 Robert McKay (1911)
 Jeff Musselman (1982–85)
 George Owen (1923)
 Ray Peters (1967–68)
 Kevin Reilly (1949)
 Jack Robinson (1899–1902)
 Mike Stenhouse (1977–79)
 Jim Tyng (1873–79)
 Pete Varney (1968–71)
 Barrett Wendell Jr. (1902)
 Rick Wolff (1970–72)

Major League Baseball Draft

2008
In 2008, Shawn Haviland was selected in the 33rd round of the 2008 Major League Baseball draft by the Oakland Athletics. In 2006, Haviland was named Ivy League Pitcher of the Year. In 2005, Haviland helped Harvard win the Ivy League Baseball Championship Series, qualifying the team for the 2005 NCAA Division I baseball tournament.

2011
One Crimson player was selected in the 2011 Major League Baseball Draft. P Max Perlman was selected by the Oakland Athletics in the 35th round and chose to sign a professional contract.

2012
Three players were selected in the 2012 Major League Baseball Draft: P Brent Suter by the Milwaukee Brewers (31st round), P Andrew Ferreira by the Minnesota Twins (32nd round), and 3B Jeff Reynolds by the New York Mets (38th round). All three players elected to sign professional contracts with their respective clubs.

Rivalry with Yale

History
Harvard's baseball program has a long history in the school's well-known rivalry with Yale University. Overall, Harvard has a 194–178–1 record against Yale, whom they have played more than any other team.

The two schools' first athletic competition was a crew race in 1852– the United States' first intercollegiate athletic competition. Harvard first played Yale's baseball program on July 25, 1868. The Crimson won, 25–17, and went on to win the teams' first eight meetings. Yale won five of the next seven, including a 5–0 win in 1877 in which pitcher Charles Carter threw what later became known as a perfect game.

The two teams have played in nearly every season since, with a few exceptions. In 1891, Yale refused on account of Harvard's refusal to play Princeton in 1890 and 1891. The rivalry also was not played in 1917, 1944, or 1945, when Harvard did not sponsor a team due to the World Wars.

In the late 19th and early 20th centuries, baseball games between Harvard and Yale attracted much attention. At the end of each season, the teams played two games, one each in Cambridge and New Haven; if the teams split these games, a third was scheduled to decide that year's champion. In 1913, for example, when Yale won 2–0 in New Haven and Harvard won 4–3 in Cambridge, a third game was scheduled at Ebbets Field, the home field of Major League Baseball's Brooklyn Dodgers; Harvard won, 6–5. The games regularly drew crowds of over 10,000. The 1913 championship game at Ebbets saw an attendance mark of 15,000; a June 23, 1908, game (which Harvard lost 3–0) was attended by 14,000 spectators, including Secretary of War William Howard Taft, a Yale alumnus who had unofficially been named the Republican nominee for president only days earlier.

The two teams became conference rivals in the Eastern Intercollegiate Baseball League after Harvard joined for the 1933 season. Both teams were competitive in the league– Harvard won 21 titles, while Yale won 10. The teams finished 1–2 in the league standings five times (1937, 1947, 1955, 1980, and 1984). In 1980, the two teams met in the EIBL tiebreaker with an NCAA Tournament bid at stake; Harvard swept Yale in two games, 11–3 and 6–2, to advance.

Since the two teams began competing in the Rolfe Division in 1993, the teams have finished 1–2 in the division standings four times. In those four seasons, Yale won the division once (in 1993), while Harvard won it the other three times (1996, 1997, and 1998).

Format
The format of the team's yearly meetings has changed frequently. From 1868–1871, the teams played only a single game. The home-and-home format popular for much of the rivalry's early history was adopted in 1872, and the tiebreaker game was played, as necessary, starting in 1877. The home-and-home format was stretched to four games during several seasons in the late-19th century, with a fifth, tie-breaking game played on multiple occasions. When Harvard joined the EIBL for the 1933 season, the tiebreaker format was scrapped. From 1935–1940, the teams instead played a regularly scheduled third game in New London, Connecticut, on the same day as the Harvard–Yale Regatta. The rivalry's schedule became irregular during the years of World War II. Following the war, formats varied until the schools began playing a regular three-game series in 1954. The rivalry consisted of three-game series from 1954–1960, two-game series from 1961–1966, and a mix of single games and doubleheaders from 1967–1980. In the last years of the EIBL (1981–1992), the two teams played one doubleheader each season, alternating home teams between seasons. Since the Ivy League began sponsoring baseball in 1993, Harvard and Yale have played a yearly four-game series, held entirely at one school, as part of Rolfe Division play.

Popular culture

"Call Me Maybe" video
During the 2012 season, the program received attention from national media outlets for a Youtube video in which members of the team dubbed the Carly Rae Jepsen song "Call Me Maybe." The video, filmed during a van ride to a road game, was viewed 2 million times in the five days after its release and led to many imitations by other sports teams. The video was choreographed and directed by senior pitcher Connor Hulse. Eight players appeared in the video: in the front row, from left to right, senior catcher Jon Smart and junior pitcher Joey Novak; in the middle row, sophomore pitcher Andrew Ferreira, senior first baseman/pitcher Marcus Way, and junior second baseman Kyle Larrow; in the back row, sophomore outfielder Jack Colton (who was asleep), senior infielder/catcher Jeff Reynolds, sophomore catcher/first baseman Steve Dill and cameraman Connor Hulse.

The Little Book
In the 2008 Selden Edwards novel The Little Book, protagonist Wheeler Burden plays baseball for Harvard in the early 1960s.

See also
 List of NCAA Division I baseball programs

Notes

References

External links